Jörg-Uwe Klütz (born 27 July 1968) is a retired German football defender and later manager.

References

1968 births
Living people
German footballers
VfL Herzlake players
Hannover 96 players
VfB Oldenburg players
BV Cloppenburg players
Association football defenders
2. Bundesliga players
German football managers
BV Cloppenburg managers
People from Osnabrück (district)
Footballers from Lower Saxony
West German footballers